John Kelly (born 11 June 1930) is an Australian equestrian. He competed in two events at the 1964 Summer Olympics.

References

1930 births
Living people
Australian male equestrians
Olympic equestrians of Australia
Equestrians at the 1964 Summer Olympics
Place of birth missing (living people)